Louis B. Mayer Pictures (or Louis B. Mayer Productions) was an American film production company of the silent era which operated from 1918 until 1924.

History

Founded by the New England-based theater owner Louis B. Mayer, it functioned as a high-class producer of films for the first-run market. One of the leading Mayer stars was Anita Stewart who was recruited from Vitagraph Studios. The company had a long-running distribution arrangement with First National Pictures. Mayer appointed Irving Thalberg as head of production following his stint at Universal Pictures.

In 1924, the company was part of a series of mergers by Marcus Loew that brought together Metro Pictures and Goldwyn Pictures into a single outfit MGM, which was a central major studio of the classical era. Although the new company was initially known as Metro-Goldwyn, within a year the name Mayer had been added to the title in acknowledgement of his key role in the studio.

Films

References

Bibliography 
 Eyman, Scott. Lion of Hollywood: The Life and Legend of Louis B. Mayer. Simon and Schuster, 2008.
 Schatz, Thomas. The Genius of the System: Hollywood Filmmaking in the Studio Era. Henry Holt and Company, 2015.

American film studios
Film production companies of the United States
1918 establishments in the United States
1924 disestablishments in the United States
Mass media companies established in 1918
Mass media companies disestablished in 1924
1924 mergers and acquisitions
.